The Building at 51 Hunt Street in Quincy, Massachusetts, is one of a relatively small number of triple decker apartment buildings in the city.  Built in 1907 by Charles Stratton as part of his development of North Quincy as a rail-commuter suburb, it is a three-story wood-frame structure, with a flat roof and wooden clapboard siding.  The building is notable for its high parapet and its unusual porch balustrades.  The roof line has a cornice with dentil moulding and simple brackets.

The building was listed on the National Register of Historic Places in 1989.

See also
National Register of Historic Places listings in Quincy, Massachusetts

References

External links
 Quincy, Mass. Historical and Architectural Survey on 51 Hunt Street

Buildings and structures in Quincy, Massachusetts
Italianate architecture in Massachusetts
National Register of Historic Places in Quincy, Massachusetts
Houses in Norfolk County, Massachusetts
Houses on the National Register of Historic Places in Norfolk County, Massachusetts
Houses completed in 1907